The Triumph Bonneville T120 1200 is a British motorcycle designed and built in Hinckley, Leicestershire by Triumph Motorcycles Ltd.

Models

Bonneville T120

Bonneville T120 Black

Bud Ekins T120

See also
List of Triumph motorcycles

References

External links

www.triumphmotorcycles.co.uk - Bonneville T120

Bonneville T120 1200
Motorcycles introduced in the 2010s
Standard motorcycles